The 2002 Big South Conference men's basketball tournament took place February 28–March 2, 2002, at the Roanoke Civic Center in Roanoke, Virginia. For the fourth consecutive year, the tournament was won by the Winthrop Eagles, led by head coach Gregg Marshall.

Format
All eight teams participated in the tournament, hosted at the Roanoke Civic Center. Teams were seeded by conference winning percentage. Birmingham–Southern was in a transitional phase to the conference during the season, and not technically counted as a conference member.

Bracket

* Asterisk indicates overtime game
Source

All-Tournament Team
Greg Lewis, Winthrop
Pierre Wooten, Winthrop
Jay Wallace, High Point
Joe Knight, High Point
Correy Watkins, Radford

References

Tournament
Big South Conference men's basketball tournament
Big South Conference men's basketball tournament
Big South Conference men's basketball tournament
Big South Conference men's basketball tournament